Oteševo is a village in the Resen Municipality of North Macedonia. The village is without permanent residents.

There are some lakeside resorts nearby.

Demographics
The last census in which Oteševo still had permanent residents was in 1981.

References

Ghost towns in Europe
Villages in Resen Municipality